Bethanie Mattek-Sands and Meghann Shaughnessy were the defending champions but Shaughnessy decided not to participate.
Mattek-Sands plays alongside Jarmila Gajdošová, but lost in the first round.
Liezel Huber and Lisa Raymond won the title, defeating Anna-Lena Grönefeld and Petra Martić 7–6(7–3), 6–1 in the final.

Seeds

Draw

Draw

References
 Main Draw

Open GDF Suez - Doubles
Doubles 2012